Rooftop primarily refers to:
 The top of a roof
 In particular, the top of a flat roof

Rooftop or Rooftops may also refer to:

Film and TV
Rooftops (film), 1989 American film
The Rooftops (film), 2013 Algerian film directed by Merzak Allouache
The Rooftop (film) (天台 Tiāntái), 2013 Taiwanese musical film

Music
Rooftop (album), by Ulrik Munther 
Rooftops, EP by Fellowship Creative
The Rooftop (album), DJ Webstar
"Rooftop" (song), by Swedish singer Zara Larsson
"Rooftop", by German singer Nico Santos
"Rooftops (A Liberation Broadcast)", song by Lostprophets
"Rooftops", song by Danny Elfman from the album IRIS: A Journey Through the World of Cinema by Cirque du Soleil
"NYC Rooftops", song by Bob & Bill from the album PARAMOUR by Cirque du Soleil
"Rooftops", asong by Kris Allen from the 2012 album Thank You Camellia
"Rooftops", a song on Rolling Papers (Wiz Khalifa album)
Rooftops performed by Jeffrey Osborne from Rooftops (film)

See also
 Roof (disambiguation)